Harischandrapur railway station is an important railway station on the Howrah–New Jalpaiguri line of Katihar railway division of Northeast Frontier Railway Zone. It is situated beside National Highway 81 at Harischandrapur of Malda district in the Indian state of West Bengal. Toatal 34 trains including number of express trains stop at Harischandrapur railway station. This station serves Harishchandrapur I and Harishchandrapur II Community Development Block.

Trains
Major Trains available from this railway station are as follows:
 Chennai–New Jalpaiguri Superfast Express
 Sealdah-Alipurduar Kanchan Kanya Express
 Dibrugarh-Howrah Kamrup Express via Guwahati
Dibrugarh–Howrah Kamrup Express Via Rangapara North
Sealdah-New Alipurdiar Teesta Torsha Express
 New Jalpaiguri -Malda Town Express
 Kolkata–Radhikapur Express
 Howrah Katihar Express
 Sealdah Saharsha Hate Bazare Express
 Kolkata–Jogbani Express
 Kolkata–Haldibari Intercity Express
 Siliguri Junction-Balurghat Express

References

Railway stations in Malda district
Katihar railway division